Fatma is a surname. Notable people with the surname include:

Kara Fatma (1888–1955), Turkish militia leader and soldier
Tazeen Fatma (born 1949), Indian politician

See also
Fatima (given name)